Ezeh is an African surname that may refer to
Charles Ezeh (born 1997), Nigerian football player
Chidera Ezeh (born 1997),　Nigerian football player
Colly Ezeh (born 1979), Nigerian-born Hong Kong football player
Florence Ezeh (born 1977), hammer thrower from Togo
Henry Ezeh (born 1991), Nigerian football striker
Ikechukwu Ezeh (born 1987), Nigerian football striker
Obi Ezeh (born 1988), American football linebacker